Leucopogon cochlearifolius is a species of flowering plant in the heath family Ericaceae and is endemic to the south-west of Western Australia. It is a bushy shrublet with many branchlets, triangular to spoon-shaped leaves, and white flowers arranged in clusters on short side-shoots.

Description
Leaves on short flowering shoots are crowded near the tip and are slightly smaller than those on long shoots. The flowers are arranged in groups of three to seven at the ends of short side-branches, with egg-shaped bracts and broadly egg-shaped bracteoles. Flowering occurs from July to January.

Taxonomy and naming
Leucopogon cochlearifolius was first formally described in 1986 by Arne Strid in the journal Willdenowia from specimens he collected north of Badgingarra in 1982. The specific epithet (cochlearifolius) means "spoon-leaved".

Distribution and habitat
This leucopogon grows on sand or gravelly laterite in the Avon Wheatbelt, Geraldton Sandplains and Swan Coastal Plain bioregions of south-western Western Australia.

Conservation status
Leucopogon cochlearifolius is classified as "not threatened" by the Western Australian Government Department of Biodiversity, Conservation and Attractions.

References

cochlearifolius
Ericales of Australia
Flora of Western Australia
Plants described in 1986
Taxa named by Arne Strid